Amit Sahai (born 1974) is an American computer scientist. He is a professor of computer science at UCLA and the director of the Center for Encrypted Functionalities.

Biography
Amit Sahai was born in 1974 in Thousand Oaks, California, to parents who had
immigrated from India. He received a B.A. in mathematics with a computer
science minor from the University of California, Berkeley, summa cum laude, in
1996.
At Berkeley, Sahai was named Computing Research Association Outstanding
Undergraduate of the Year, North America, and was a member of the three-person
team that won first place in the 1996 ACM International Collegiate Programming Contest.

Sahai received his Ph.D. in computer science from MIT in 2000, and joined the
computer science faculty at Princeton University. In
2004 he moved to UCLA, where he currently holds the position of professor of
computer science.

Research and recognition
Amit Sahai's research interests are in security and cryptography, and theoretical
computer science more broadly. He has published more than 100 original
technical research papers.

Notable contributions by Sahai include:
 Obfuscation. Sahai is a co-inventor of the first candidate general-purpose indistinguishability obfuscation schemes, with security based on a mathematical conjecture. This development generated much interest in the cryptography community and was called "a watershed moment for cryptography." Earlier, Sahai co-authored a seminal paper formalizing the notion of cryptographic obfuscation and showing that strong forms of this notion are impossible to realize.
 Functional Encryption. Sahai co-authored papers which introduced attribute-based encryption and functional encryption.
 Results on Zero-Knowledge Proofs. Sahai co-authored several important results on zero-knowledge proofs, in particular introducing the concept of concurrent zero-knowledge proofs. Sahai also co-authored the paper that introduced the MPC-in-the-head technique for using secure multi-party computation (MPC) protocols for efficient zero-knowledge proofs.
 Results on Secure Multi-Party Computation. Sahai is a co-author on many important results on MPC, including the first universally composably secure MPC protocol, the first such protocol that avoided the need for trusted set-ups (using "Angel-aided simulation") and the IPS compiler for building efficient MPC protocols. He is also a co-editor of a book on the topic.

Sahai has given a number of invited talks including the 2004 Distinguished Cryptographer Lecture
Series at NTT Labs, Japan. He was named an Alfred P. Sloan Foundation Research
Fellow in 2002, received an Okawa Research Grant Award in 2007, a Xerox
Foundation Faculty Award in 2010, and a Google Faculty Research Award in 2010.
His research has been covered by several news agencies including the BBC World
Service.

Sahai was elected as an ACM Fellow in 2018 for "contributions to cryptography and to the development of indistinguishability obfuscation".

In 2019, he was named a Fellow of the International Association for Cryptologic Research for "fundamental contributions, including to secure computation, zero knowledge, and functional encryption, and for service to the IACR."

Sahai was named a Simons Investigator by the Simons Foundation in 2021. He was also named a Fellow of the Royal Society of Arts.

In 2022, he received the Michael and Shelia Held Prize from the National Academy of Sciences for “outstanding, innovative, creative, and influential research in the areas of combinatorial and discrete optimization, or related parts of computer science, such as the design and analysis of algorithms and complexity theory.”

References

Modern cryptographers
University of California, Berkeley alumni
MIT School of Engineering alumni
Theoretical computer scientists
Living people
1974 births
People from Thousand Oaks, California
Princeton University faculty
UCLA Henry Samueli School of Engineering and Applied Science faculty
Fellows of the Association for Computing Machinery
Competitive programmers
American people of Indian descent